Gianpietro is a masculine Italian given name. Notable people with the name include:

Gianpietro Carlesso (born 1961), Italian artist
Gianpietro Marchetti (born 1948), Italian footballer
Gianpietro Piovani (born 1972), Italian footballer and manager
Gianpietro Zecchin (born 1983), Italian footballer

Italian masculine given names